Kwabena Asare (born February 25, 1992) is a professional Canadian football offensive lineman who is currently a free agent. He played U Sports football at Carleton.

University career
Asare played U Sports football for five seasons for the Carleton Ravens from 2012 to 2016 while pursuing a degree in Communication and Media Studies. He was selected to play in the 2016 East-West Bowl as a member of the East Team.

Professional career

Edmonton Eskimos
After being selected in the sixth round of the 2017 CFL Draft by the Edmonton Eskimos, Asare spent two seasons on the team's practice squad. He was promoted to the active roster in 2019, appearing in five games that season. After the season, Asare entered free agency for the first time in his career. He signed with the Eskimos on February 3, 2020. However, he did not play in 2020 due to the cancellation of the 2020 CFL season. Asare was then released on July 19, 2021, prior to the 2021 season.

Calgary Stampeders
Soon after his release from Edmonton, Asare signed with the Calgary Stampeders on July 22, 2021. However, he was released one week later on July 29, 2021.

Montreal Alouettes
On October 25, 2021, it was announced that Asare had signed with the Montreal Alouettes. He remained on the practice roster for the rest of 2021 and became a free agent at the end of the season. He re-signed with the Alouettes on March 8, 2022. He spent part of 2022 training camp with the team, but was released after the first pre-season game on May 29, 2022.

Personal life
Asare was born in Ghana and raised in Brampton.

References

External links
 Montreal Alouettes bio
 Carleton Ravens bio

1992 births
Living people
Carleton Ravens football players
Canadian football offensive linemen
Edmonton Elks players
Players of Canadian football from Ontario
Sportspeople from Brampton
Ghanaian players of Canadian football
Black Canadian players of Canadian football
Calgary Stampeders players
Montreal Alouettes players